Émilie Vina (born March 24, 1982, in Bonneville, Haute-Savoie) is a French cross-country skier  and non-commissioned officer who has competed since 2000. Competing in two Winter Olympics, she earned her best finish of ninth in the 4 × 5 km relay at Turin in 2006 and had her best individual finish of 47th in the individual sprint event at those same games.

Vina's best finish at the FIS Nordic World Ski Championships was ninth in the 4 × 5 km relay at Val di Fiemme in 2003 while her best individual finish was 36th in the individual sprint event at those same championships.

Her best World Cup finish was fifth twice (2004, 2006) while her best individual finish was 14th in an individual sprint event at Germany in 2005.

Cross-country skiing results
All results are sourced from the International Ski Federation (FIS).

Olympic Games

World Championships

World Cup

Season standings

References

External links
 
 
 

1982 births
Living people
People from Bonneville, Haute-Savoie
Cross-country skiers at the 2006 Winter Olympics
Cross-country skiers at the 2010 Winter Olympics
French female cross-country skiers
Olympic cross-country skiers of France
Sportspeople from Haute-Savoie
21st-century French women